Rumelange is a commune with town status in south-western Luxembourg, on the border with France.

Populated places
The commune consists of the following villages:

 Rumelange
 Haut-Tétange (lieu-dit)

Population

History
Rumelange was formed on 25 September 1891, when it was detached from the commune of Kayl. The law forming Rumelange was passed on 27 June 1891.

Population
As of the 1 February 2011 census, the commune had a population of 5,038. , the town of Rumelange, which lies in the east of the commune, has a population of 4,818.

Museum
It is the site of some of the underground iron mines no longer in operation.  Rumelange is home to Luxembourg's National Mining Museum.

Notable people
 Batty Weber (1860–1940) an influential journalist and author
 Alfred Kieffer (1904–1987) a Luxembourgian footballer, competed in the 1924 Summer Olympics
 Foni Tissen (1909–1975) a Luxembourg schoolteacher and artist of hyperrealistic, darkly humorous paintings
 Emile Kirscht (1913–1994) a Luxembourg painter and a co-founder of the Iconomaques group of abstract artists in Luxembourg 
 Ernest Toussaint (1908-1942) boxer, competed in the 1936 Summer Olympics; resistance member

Twin towns — sister cities

Rumelange is twinned with:
 Petnjica, Montenegro

References

External links
 

 
Cities in Luxembourg
Communes in Esch-sur-Alzette (canton)
Towns in Luxembourg
France–Luxembourg border crossings